Hymenophyllum demissum is a species of fern in the family Hymenophyllaceae. H. demissum is found in New Zealand, with a specific example occurrence being in North Island's Hamilton Ecological District in a Nothofagus-podocarp forest in association with other fern species understory plants, crown fern, Blechnum discolor being an example.

References
 C. Michael Hogan. 2009. Crown Fern: Blechnum discolor, Globaltwitcher.com, ed. N. Stromberg
 Leonard Cockayne. 1921. The vegetation of New Zealand, published by W. Engelmann, 364 pages

Line notes

demissum
Ferns of New Zealand